Events in the year 2021 in Eritrea.

Incumbents

Events 

January 7 – Ethiopian Maj. Gen. Belay Seyoum is quoted by Addis Ababa′s Standard magazine confirming the presence of Eritrean Army troops in the Tigray Region of Ethiopia. There are nearly 100,000 Eritrean refugees in Tigray.
January 25 – Members of the Eritrean Army are accused of widespread looting and weaponizing hunger in the Tigray Region.
January 27 – The United States Department of State demands that Eritrea withdraw from Tigray.
February 17 – The United Arab Emirates (UAE) dismantles part of its military base as tensions in Yemen wind down.

Deaths
February 19 – Adhanom Ghebremariam, 72, military officer and political dissident.

See also

COVID-19 pandemic in Africa
Tigray War
African Union
Common Market for Eastern and Southern Africa
Community of Sahel–Saharan States

References 

 
2020s in Eritrea
Years of the 21st century in Eritrea
Eritrea 
Eritrea